Vestia elata is a species of gastropods belonging to the family Clausiliidae.

The species is found in Central Europe.

References

Clausiliidae